Kamouraska is a 1973 French-Canadian film directed and written by Claude Jutra, based on the 1970 novel of the same name by Anne Hébert. At the time of its release it was the most expensive film ever made in Canadian history. It won four Canadian Film Awards, but was unsuccessful at the box office.

Plot
The film is set in rural Québec in the 1830s. Élisabeth at the deathbed of her second husband, Jérôme Rolland, is recounting her past, which is conveyed through a series of flashbacks. She was first married to Antoine, the brutish seigneur of Kamouraska, and fell in love with a Loyalist American doctor, Georges Nelson. He murdered Antoine. At her trial for complicity in the killing, Élisabeth is acquitted. She marries Jérôme to save her honour.

Cast
Geneviève Bujold as Élisabeth d'Aulnières
Richard Jordan as Georges Nelson
Philippe Léotard as Antoine Tassy
Marcel Cuvelier as Jérôme Rolland
Huguette Oligny as the mother of Élisabeth
Camille Bernard as the mother of Antoine
Janine Sutto  as Tante
Olivette Thibault as Tante
Marie Fresnières as Tante
Suzie Baillargeon as Aurélie
Colette Cortois as Florida
Gigi Duckett as Anne-Marie
Marcel Marineau as Greffier, médecin
Len Watt as Le gouverneur

Production
The film based on Anne Hébert's novel was directed and written by Claude Jutra and Michel Brault was the directory of cinematography. The French-Canadian co-production was shot from 1–29 March and 26 April to 30 June 1972. Three hours and forty minutes worth of footage was shot for the film.

The film had a budget of $750,000, but cost $905,000 to make. 75% of the funding came from Canada and 25% came from France. It was the most expensive film made in Canada at that point.

Release
The film was previewed in Kamouraska, Quebec, and premiered at Théâtre Saint-Denis in Montreal on 29 March 1973. It was distributed by France Film in Quebec and New Line Cinema in Europe. The Death of a Lumberjack was selected over Kamouraska as Canada's submission to the 1973 Cannes Film Festival, but was shown at Cannes through a special screening by the French Association of Film Critics. It was the first time the organization held a special screening since its showing of Hiroshima mon amour in 1959.

The television rights to the film were sold to the Canadian Broadcasting Corporation for $100,000, the highest amount for a Canadian film at that time. It was shown by the CBC on 6 September 1980. The theatrical version of the film was 124 minutes while the 1983 television version was 173 minutes.

Reception
The film was unsuccessful at the box office. The film was poorly reviewed by critics. Henry Herx gave it a mixed review in his Family Guide to Movies on Video: "[T]he movie captures a vanished era, has excellent acting and the beauty of its settings[,] but its story of hot passion in a cold climate is heavily melodramatic." Vincent Canby, writing in The New York Times, stated that the actors were not "able to give emotional urgency to material that depends so heavily on our believing in these characters and sharing their sense of sin and guilt".

The film won multiple awards at the Canadian Film Awards, but Geneviève Bujold was the only person from Quebec to accept an award.

Accolades

References

Works cited

External links

1973 films
Canadian drama films
Films directed by Claude Jutra
Films set in Quebec
Films shot in Quebec
Films based on Canadian novels
Films set in the 1830s
1970s French-language films
1970s English-language films
1970s Canadian films